The Minister of Economic Development, whose official name since 2022 is Minister for Business and Made in Italy, is the head of the Ministry of Economic Development in Italy. The list shows also the ministers that served under the same office but with other names, in fact this minister has changed name many times.

The current minister is Adolfo Urso, appointed on 22 October 2022 by Prime Minister Giorgia Meloni.

List of Ministers
Parties:
1946–1994:

1994–present:

Coalitions:

Timeline

External links
Ministero dello Sviluppo Economico, Official website of the Ministry of Economic Development

References

Economy